Instinct is the eighth studio album by American rock singer Iggy Pop. It was released in June 1988 by A&M Records.

Style 

After the heavily pop-oriented, radio-ready Blah Blah Blah, A&M expected another hit record from Pop; however, he instead recorded the heavy, hard-rocking Instinct. The album features Sex Pistols guitarist Steve Jones.

Release 

The album peaked at number 110 on the Billboard 200 chart. The first single from the album, "Cold Metal", charted at number 37 on Mainstream Rock Charts and earned Pop a Grammy Award nomination for Best Hard Rock/Metal performance in 1989. Videos were made for "Cold Metal" and "High on You".

Legacy 

The album was ranked number 69 on Kerrang!s "100 Greatest Heavy Metal Albums of All Time" list.

The song "Cold Metal" was briefly played in the 1990 science fiction-horror film Hardware, which also featured Iggy Pop as the voice of Angry Bob, a radio DJ.

Track listing

All tracks composed by Iggy Pop, except where noted.

 "Cold Metal" – 3:27
 "High on You" – 4:48
 "Strong Girl" (Steve Jones, Pop) – 5:04
 "Tom Tom" – 3:17
 "Easy Rider" (Steve Jones, Pop) – 4:54
 "Power & Freedom" (Steve Jones, Pop) – 3:53
 "Lowdown" – 4:30
 "Instinct" – 4:12
 "Tuff Baby" – 4:27
 "Squarehead" (Steve Jones, Pop) – 5:06

Alternate versions
 "Tuff Baby" (12" version released on "High on You" single) – 6:40
 "Tuff Baby" (Dub version) – 5:18
 "High On You" (7" edit) – 4:33
 "Cold Metal" (Rock version) – 5:05
 "Cold Metal" (Dub version) – 4:10

Personnel
Musicians
 Iggy Pop – vocals
 Steve Jones – guitar
 Seamus Beaghen – keyboards
 Leigh Foxx – bass
 Paul Garisto – drums
 Jeff Bova – CMI programming 
 Nicky Skopelitis – keyboard programming

Technical
Robert Musso – track recording
Martin Bisi – vocal recording 
Gary Grimshaw – cover design
Donald Krieger – cover graphics
Paul McAlpine – cover photography

Charts

References

External links
 

Iggy Pop albums
1988 albums
A&M Records albums
Albums produced by Bill Laswell